Cedar Brook Park is a  county park in the city of Plainfield in Union County, New Jersey. Featuring the Shakespeare Garden, it was listed on the National Register of Historic Places on June 25, 2007, for its significance in landscape architecture. The park was designed by the Olmsted Brothers of Brookline, Massachusetts from 1924 to 1930. A small portion of the park extends into the borough of South Plainfield in Middlesex County.

History and description

In 1921, the Union County Park Commission was established and hired the Olmsted Brothers, formed by the sons of landscape architect Frederick Law Olmsted, to design a county park system. The firm developed a preliminary plan for Cedar Brook Park in 1924, with work on the land and gardens completed by 1930. It is the third Olmsted Brothers designed park out of the 26 within the Union County Park System. The Shakespeare Garden is a formally designed area that originally contained plantings specifically named in Shakespeare’s works. It is maintained by the Plainfield Garden Club, with support from the New Jersey Historic Trust. A walking path connects the various features of the park, including the garden and the man-made lake on the Cedar Brook.

Tëmike Park Playground controversy
In 2022, controversy erupted over negative comments made about the opening of Tëmike Park, an LGBTQ-inclusive playground, in the park.

See also
National Register of Historic Places listings in Union County, New Jersey
National Register of Historic Places listings in Middlesex County, New Jersey
New Jersey Women's Heritage Trail

References

External links
 
 

Parks in Middlesex County, New Jersey
Parks in Union County, New Jersey
Plainfield, New Jersey
South Plainfield, New Jersey
National Register of Historic Places in Middlesex County, New Jersey
National Register of Historic Places in Union County, New Jersey
Historic districts on the National Register of Historic Places in New Jersey
Historic districts in Union County, New Jersey
Parks on the National Register of Historic Places in New Jersey
Buildings and structures completed in 1930